Lui Che Woo, GBM, MBE, JP (born 9 August 1929, Jiangmen, China) is a Hong Kong business magnate, investor, and philanthropist. He is a member of the standing committee of the Chinese People's Political Consultative Conference, Jiangmen, People's Republic of China, and is a Hong Kong gambling magnate, founder and chairman of listed firms Galaxy Entertainment Group and K. Wah International Holdings Ltd. As of June 2021, he had an estimated net worth of US$19.0 billion and ranked the fourth richest man in Hong Kong according to Bloomberg Billionaires Index.

Business career
Lui established the first K. Wah company in Hong Kong in the 1950s. Its major member companies include K. Wah International Holdings Ltd. (Stock code: 173.HK), Galaxy Entertainment Group (HKSE: 27.HK), Stanford Hotels International and K. Wah Construction Materials Limited. Today, K. Wah has developed into a multi-national conglomerate involving gambling, property, entertainment & leisure, construction materials and hotels, with over 200 subsidiaries and more than 33,000 employees in Hong Kong, mainland China, Macau, North America and South-East Asia.

In the 1960s, Lui branched out from construction materials to property investment. The 1980s marked entry into hotel development and expansion into mainland China the next decade.  In 2002, he ventured into Macau's gaming business and his business became one of the six gaming concessionaires in Macau.

In May 2011, Galaxy Entertainment Group Limited opened the $2 billion Galaxy Macau casino and hotel in Macau with 2,200 rooms, 50 restaurants, 450 gambling tables, an artificial beach and a wave pool.

Public service
Lui was chair of the Tung Wah Group of Hospitals in 1981–1982.

He also holds posts in various tertiary institutions, including founding honorary president of the University of Hong Kong Foundation of Educational Development and Research, member of the board of trustees of United College of the Chinese University of Hong Kong, honorary member of the court of Hong Kong University of Science and Technology, member of the consultative committee of the Hong Kong Polytechnic University, honorary life chair of the Hong Kong Polytechnic University Foundation, life honorary chair of Wuyi University board of trustees.

In December 2006, Lui was elected to the small-circle Election Committee, in the hotels subsector, for the third term chief executive of the Hong Kong Special Administrative Region selection process.  He has also been a member of the Hong Kong Government's steering committee on MICE (Meetings, Incentives, Conventions and Exhibitions) from 2007.

Philanthropy 
In 1999, Lui provided funds for the Stanford University Medical Centre to set up Lui Che Woo Research Laboratory.

In 2002, the Lui Che Woo Awards for CUHK/Cornell Student Exchange Programme in Hospitality Management was established to facilitate academic exchanges of the School of Hotel and Tourism Management.

The construction of the Lui Che Woo Building at the Hong Kong Polytechnic University.

In 2012, a donation was made to the Chinese University of Hong Kong for the establishment of the Lui Che Woo Institute of Innovative Medicine.

In 2015, Lui pledged to donate HK$15.6 million to the Chinese University of Hong Kong to establish the Lui Che Woo Distinguished Young Scholars Award and the Lui Che Woo Distinguished Young Scholars Research Scholarship to support outstanding medical research students to further their studies overseas.

Marking K. Wah Group's 60th anniversary in 2015, Lui established the Lui Che Woo Prize – Prize for World Civilisation, in Hong Kong, an international prize said to honour and recognise individuals or organisations for, inter alia, "promotion of positive life attitude and enhancement of positive energy".

Support for education and other causes 
In recognition of his support for education and contributions to worthwhile causes, Lui has been conferred with a number of honorary degrees. In 2001, he was awarded the degree of Doctor of Laws, Honoris Causa by the University of Victoria. In 2002, Lui was conferred the degree of Doctor of Social Science, Honoris Causa, by the Chinese University of Hong Kong and an honorary University Fellowship by the University of Hong Kong. In 2004, he was awarded the degree of Honorary Doctor of Laws by Concordia University in 2004. In 2005, Lui was awarded the degree of Doctor of Business Administration, Honoris Causa, by the Hong Kong Polytechnic University in 2005, as well as the degree of Doctor of Social Sciences, Honoris Causa, by the University of Hong Kong in 2016.

Other achievements 
In 1982, Lui was made a Member of the Order of the British Empire (MBE) by Queen Elizabeth and was appointed as a justice of the peace (JP) in 1986.

In 2005, Lui was also awarded the Gold Bauhinia Star (GBS) for his contributions to the development of Hong Kong.

In 2007, Lui was honoured as the Business Person of the Year at the DHL/South China Morning Post Hong Kong Business Awards.

In 2012, he was awarded the Grand Bauhinia Medal by the HKSAR Government for his significant contribution to Hong Kong.

References

Sources

 About Dr Che-woo Lui

External links
 K. Wah Group
 K. Wah International Holdings Ltd.
 Galaxy Entertainment Group Limited
 LUI Che Woo Prize – Prize for World Civilisation

1929 births
Living people
Billionaires from Guangdong
Businesspeople from Guangdong
Hong Kong billionaires
Hong Kong casino industry businesspeople
Hong Kong chairpersons of corporations
Hong Kong chief executives
Hong Kong hoteliers
Hong Kong investors
Hong Kong philanthropists
Hong Kong real estate businesspeople
Members of the Election Committee of Hong Kong, 1998–2000
Members of the Election Committee of Hong Kong, 2000–2005
Members of the Election Committee of Hong Kong, 2007–2012
Members of the Election Committee of Hong Kong, 2012–2017
Members of the Election Committee of Hong Kong, 2017–2021
Members of the Order of the British Empire
Members of the Selection Committee of Hong Kong
People from Jiangmen